Tata Prima is a range of heavy trucks produced by Tata Motors, a wholly owned subsidiary of Tata & Sons of India. It was first introduced in 2008 as the company's 'global' truck. Tata Prima was the winner of the 'Commercial Vehicle of the Year' at the Apollo Commercial Vehicles Awards, 2010 and 2012. The 'HCV (Cargo) Truck of the Year, 2010' and the 'HCV (Rigid) Truck of the Year, 2012'.
First truck range with Common rail engine, Automatic transmission, World-class cabin with HVAC, Air suspension driver seats, Data logger for performance tracking. The trucks have a combined loading capacity of 55 tonnes, ideal for heavy-duty shipment. The interior of the Prima is equipped with modern features like GPS, air conditioning, 4-way adjustable driver and co-driver seats, ADAS features like lane departure warning, driver eye monitoring system etc.

The first in line of the Prima trucks is the Prima 4028S tractor with a 266PS Cummins ISBE engine bearing a 9 speed ZF transmission. Korean domestic market variants of the Tata Prima are equipped with either Doosan Infracore made engines (older models), or newer Cummins ISMe 440 Euro 5 engines, or IVECO FPT Cursor 11 480 Euro 6 compliant engines. The tractor is available in Saudi Arabia with 380hp with 44 ton capacity and 4×2 configuration, The tractor also has ABS and dedicated axles along with a trailer to aid in heavy goods transportation. Besides focusing on the mechanics, the tractor also focuses on driver comfort which include an air-conditioned cabin with reclining seats, arm rest and an adjustable steering wheel. Global Positioning System (GPS) is a standard feature. It has some of the features like dual-clutch which are not present in some of the trucks in its price range. There are ten major variants in the Prima range which include trucks, tractors and special application vehicles.

Korean version was facelifted in 2017. In February 2020, BS-6 version of tata prima was introduced by tata motors at Asia's largest motor show. It is equipped with the Cummins ISBE6.7 which has 250 and 300 hp variant. And it replaced by new Tata Daewoo Maxen range in 2022.

Tipper range

2825.k/tk

3525.k/tk

2830.k/tk

3530.k/tk

Tractor range

4025.s

4030.s

4625.s

4630.s

5530.s

Engines
Cummins ISBE6.7

250 hp@2300rpm

950 nm
@1000-1800 rpm

300 hp@2300rpm

1100 nm
@1000-1800 rpm

Gearbox 
2830.k/tk
3525.k/tk

Is equipped with

ZF 1115td 9s

9 speed

430 mm clutch

2825t/tk

3525.t/tk

4030.s

4025.s

4630.s

4625.s

5530.s

Is equipped with

Tata Motors G1150

9 speed

430dia clutch

It also raced in the Buddh International Circuit. It is also counted as a racing vehicle in the eyes of FIA.

References

External links
 Tata Motors Corporate Web Site
 Tata World Trucks

2000s cars
Vehicles introduced in 2009
Prima